Hobart United Football Club is an association football club that is located in Hobart, Tasmania. The club's senior men's and reserve men's sides compete in the Veto Southern Championship and Southern Championship 1 leagues. In addition to fielding senior sides, the club also fields junior and women's teams. Their home field is Pontville Oval in Brighton, Tasmania. 

The club was founded in 2002, and many of its players are immigrants or refugees to Tasmania from African countries.

Honours 
 2004: Southern Division 2 Premiers
 2005: Summer Cup Champions
 2005: Southern Division 1 Premiers
 2008: Southern Division 1 Premiers
 2010: Summer Cup Champions
 2019: Southern Championship Premiers

Club records

References

External links 
 http://www.hobartunited.com

Association football clubs established in 2002
Soccer clubs in Tasmania
2002 establishments in Australia
Sport in Hobart